, also known as Doraemon and the Wind People, is a 2003 Japanese animated science fantasy film which premiered on March 8, 2003 in Japan, based on the 23rd volume of the same name of the Doraemon Long Stories series. It's the 24th Doraemon film.

Plot 
When a mysterious tomb in a faraway land is opened by storm villagers, two strange spheres and the spirit of an ancient wizard, called Uranda sama, leader of Storm village are set free. The ancient wizard goes and possesses the body of a wolf. One of the spheres ends up in Nobita's neighborhood. Next one goes and ends up in wind village. As the first one breaks open, an odd cyclone creature is set free. First, Suneo had got it and he tried to catch it and make his pet but he was unsuccessful. Meanwhile, Nobita was eating ice cream to his way back home but that odd cyclone snatched it. Nobita followed it and then the cyclone threw the ice cream at the head of Gian. Due to this he becomes angry and he tries to beat Nobita but he ends up with a crash in a trash box. then the cyclone followed Nobita to his house. It created a disaster, annoying Nobita's mom. Then he liked it so much that he wanted to keep it. While trying to take care of it, Nobita tried to hide it from his mom. So he made its appearance like a doll in a manga (a soft toy machine camera to make it as a toy). Then he takes it to Shizuka to show her. But the odd cyclone runs away after getting scolded by Nobita for blowing Shizuka's skirt up. Then when Nobita was alone, the odd cyclone flew up to him. He named it Fuuko, and declared that Fuuko is a girl.

As there was no space in the Nobita's neighbourhood, he and his friends with Doraemon use Anywhere door but they got accidentally taken to a location hidden from the rest of the world: the Wind Village. There they discover different types of creatures and meet some incredible people and also made friends with Temujin and his family. They enjoy there very much and played a wind top game with Temujin. Nobita wins the game with good shots. In evening they return from Anywhere door. They left Fuuko at Wind Village. Seeing the Anywhere door, the ancient wizard also comes through it. Then it possessed the body of Suneo. Meanwhile, Temujin discovers next sphere. But it flies away and goes to wizard. Next day Doraemon and his friends again visit Wind Village. They meet Storm Villagers and also the wizard in the appearance of Suneo. Then they attack them and in this process they capture Fuuko and also steal Doraemon's pocket. They trap Fuuko in a prison and they have enjoyment. Meanwhile, Doraemon and his friends go to prison and free Fuuko. There caused massive typhoons throughout the land. Doraemon and the others then join forces with the Wind Village to prevent the worst from happening. At this process, Fuuko loses her power and goes somewhere far. Nobita fell into a trap and reunited with Fuuko when he tried to help Shizuka when she fell. A yak advised Nobita to take care of Fuuko and not to bring her near the red jewel sphere. when Uranda sama woke Mafuuga the dragon in front of the red jewel, Fuuko's soul along with another soul. Then Suneo becomes normal. One of the person of storm village was most wanted criminal of twenty-second century. He was an archaeologist. He controlled the dragon Mafuuga (formerly by the ancient wizard Uranda sama and trapped the wizard in a spirit capturing cage. Nobita took a heavy sword to thrash him but in vain. Then Fuuko went to the volcano to ignite herself and went to the opposite direction (swirling herself while Mafuuga was swirling in Fuuko's Opposite direction). She sacrificed herself, leaving the soft toy she wore. Nobita was in tears. He vowed that he wouldn't forget her till his last breath. Then he took the soft toy (Suneo said to Gian to leave Nobita alone for a few minutes when Gian wanted to comfort Nobita. Then time patrol came to capture the crook. So he was captured by time patrol and Nobita bids goodbye to Temujin and his family and hugged the soft toy. Doraemon and his friends returned home.

The next morning, when Nobita went to school, he saw a mini twirl of wind following him, reminding him of Fuuko. He smiled as he went home.

Cast

References

External links 
 Doraemon The Movie 25th page 
 
 Doraemon Toofani Adventure (Nobita Windmaster)  at CartoonsPedia

2003 films
2003 anime films
Nobita and the Mysterious Wind Wizard
Films directed by Tsutomu Shibayama
2000s ghost films
Films set in Mongolia
Films set in Xinjiang
Animated films about robots
Films about Tibet
2000s children's animated films
Japanese children's fantasy films
Films about spirit possession